LTSR may refer to:
London, Tilbury and Southend Railway, a railway line from London to Southend in England.
LTS Rail, a post-privatisation train operating company, later renamed c2c.
The Lithuanian Soviet Socialist Republic (in Lithuanian: Lietuvos Tarybų Socialistinė Respublika).
Lone Tree Scout Reservation
 Long-Term Service Release - infrequent updates to supplied software, with only essential low-risk changes, that gives minimum disruption to organisations that don't want the effort, cost and risk of frequent updates.